In enzymology, a Watasenia-luciferin 2-monooxygenase is an enzyme that catalyzes the chemical reaction

Watasenia luciferin + O2  oxidized Watasenia luciferin + CO2 + hnu

Thus, the two substrates of this enzyme are Watasenia luciferin and O2, whereas its 3 products are oxidized Watasenia luciferin, CO2, and hn.

This enzyme belongs to the family of oxidoreductases, specifically, those acting on single donors with O2 as oxidant and incorporation of two atoms of oxygen into the substrate (oxygenases). The oxygen incorporated need not be derived from O with the incorporation of one atom of oxygen (internal monooxygenases o internal mixed-function oxidases).  The systematic name of this enzyme class is Watasenia-luciferin:oxygen 2-oxidoreductase (decarboxylating). This enzyme is also called Watasenia-type luciferase.

References

 

EC 1.13.12
Enzymes of unknown structure